Robert Tasso (born 18 December 1989) is a Vanuatuan association footballer. He currently plays for Tafea and the Vanuatu national football team, as a forward.

International career

Tasso made his debut for Vanuatu on 8 July 2011, in the 2-1 defeat to Solomon Islands. He has seven caps for the national team, five of these coming in July 2011. The two other international appearances both came in the 2011 Pacific Games in August and September 2011. He has scored twice for Vanuatu, against Fiji on 15 July 2011 and then against Guam in a 4-1 win on 3 September 2011.

International appearances and goals

References

Living people
1989 births
Vanuatuan footballers
Vanuatu international footballers
Tafea F.C. players
Spirit 08 F.C. players
Association football forwards
Vanuatu youth international footballers
2012 OFC Nations Cup players